Men's shot put events for amputee athletes were held at the 2004 Summer Paralympics in the Athens Olympic Stadium. Events were held in two disability classes.

F42

The F42 event was won by Fanie Lombaard, representing .

19 September 2004, 17:15

F44/46

The F44/46 event was won by Jackie Christiansen, representing .

24 September 2004, 17:00

References

M